The Rhine Research Center is an independent, non-profit parapsychology research center that takes a scientific approach to anomalous phenomena and exceptional human experience.  According to the mission statement, the "Rhine's mission is to advance the science of parapsychology, to provide education and resources for the public, and to foster a community for individuals with personal and professional interest in PSI." It is the successor to the Parapsychology Laboratory at Duke University.

In 1965, when J. B. Rhine reached mandatory retirement age, he left Duke University and founded an independent non-profit organization called the Foundation for Research on the Nature of Man.  The current research center is a successor to this organization, and it is no longer affiliated with Duke University. The Rhine Research Center continues to conduct parapsychology research today, but it also provides online courses, educational events, and holds meetings for people interested in parapsychology and psi phenomena. The current president is Jack Hebrank.

References

External links
 

Parapsychology
Duke University
1965 establishments in North Carolina
501(c)(3) organizations
Research institutes established in 1965
Organizations based in Durham, North Carolina
Paranormal organizations